Biospeedotrema biospeedoi is a species of trematodes inhabiting hydrothermal vent fishes (particularly Thermichthys hollisi) in the south eastern Pacific Ocean. It can be distinguished from its family by its symmetrical testicular configuration; its uterus passing between the testes. Furthermore, it differs from its cogenerates by the shape of its body; its uterine extent is posterior to its testes and its small vitellarium.

References

Further reading
Bray, Rodney A., et al. "The molecular phylogeny of the digenean family Opecoelidae Ozaki, 1925 and the value of morphological characters, with the erection of a new subfamily." Folia parasitologica 63 (2016): 013.
Shedko, M. B., S. G. Sokolov, and D. M. Atopkin. "The first record of Dimerosaccus oncorhynchi (Trematoda: Opecoelidae) in fishes from rivers of Primorsky Territory, Russia, with a discussion on its taxonomic position using morphological and molecular data." ПАРАЗИТОЛОГИЯ 49 (2015): 3.

External links
WORMS

Plagiorchiida
Parasitic helminths of fish
Animals described in 2014